Ernestine McClendon (c. 1918 – 1991) was an American actress, comedian, activist, talent agent, and entrepreneur. She was the first Black talent agent, and the talent agent to represent Black talent. Her career spanned the latter half of the 20th century.

Early life 

Ernestine McClendon was born Ernestine Epps on August 17, in Norfolk, Virginia, in either 1914, 1918, or 1924, according to different sources.

Epps was educated at Virginia State College, an HBCU. Then, from 1935 to 1936, she studied acting under Michael Howard at Columbia University.

Around 1935 to 1936 (actual date unknown), Epps married her husband, actor and comedian George Wiltshire, and they adopted their daughter, Phyllis. It is unknown how or when Ernestine Epps came to be known by the surname McClendon.

Career in New York 

McClendon had been acting since her time at Columbia University, but in 1950, she landed her first television role as Clementine on No Time for Comedy, and this launched her eighteen-year successful acting and comedy career. During the course of this career, she performed on television, in movies, and on stage in both on- and off-Broadway productions. Her very first comedy appearance was at the Apollo Theater in Harlem, alongside her husband and his partner, comedian Pigmeat Markham. She later made a guest appearance on the Ed Sullivan Show with Markham. In 1960, she played Lena Younger in a production of Lorraine Hansberry's A Raisin in the Sun.
 
Around 1960, McClendon noticed a crack in the unofficial ban on Black actors in advertising: a single television commercial that featured a Black actor. She decided to use that crack to her advantage and she began a one-woman letter writing campaign, targeting both acting agencies and product manufacturers, pushing them to hire Black actors for commercials. McClendon's activism caught the attention of talent agent Lillian Arnold, who hired her to draw Black talent to Arnold's agency. From there, McClendon went on to manage actors of all races for Arnold's agency, and in 1963, she opened McClendon Enterprises. For much of the sixties, McClendon was a high-profile advocate for Black actors, placing clients in all kinds of roles including theater, television, movies, radio, and nightclubs.

McClendon was not only the first Black talent agent, and the first agent for Black talent; she was also the first woman in her field to be franchised by all four acting unions at the time—the American Guild of Variety Artists, the American Federation of Television and Radio Artists, Actors Equity, and the Screen Actors Guild—as a theatrical agent.

Later life in Los Angeles 
In 1971, McClendon was in a car accident that caused a lasting injury to her leg. Feeling that a more temperate climate would allow her less pain, she and her husband relocated to California, and they opened a West Coast office of McClendon Enterprises. Although as newcomers to Hollywood, the business struggled for the first few years, eventually McClendon made a name for herself again, and went on to work with notable clients such as Raymond St. Jacques, Gloria Foster, Gail Fisher, and Morgan Freeman.

On September 23, 1991, Ernestine McClendon passed away of cancer at Good Samaritan Hospital in Los Angeles, California. Her obituaries reported her final age as 77.

References 

1991 deaths
American actresses
American talent agents
Virginia State University alumni
Columbia University alumni